Paul Ian Bence (born 21 December 1948) is an English former professional footballer who made more than 250 appearances in the Football League playing for Brighton & Hove Albion, Reading, Brentford and Torquay United. He played as a defensive midfielder or as a right back.

Career 
Bence was born in Littlehampton, Sussex. He began his career as an apprentice with Brighton & Hove Albion, turning professional in May 1967. He had previously captained Sussex Schools Under-15 side. His league debut (and only league appearance for Brighton) came as a substitute the following season. In June 1968 he left for Reading, but was only to make 14 league appearances, scoring twice, in the next two seasons at Elm Park. In July 1970 Reading released the player and he joined Brentford, where he established himself, making 268 appearances, scoring six goals and winning the club's Players' Player of the Year award in the 1972–73 season. In November 1976, having lost his place at Brentford, he played five league games on loan at Torquay United.

He left Brentford in March 1977, subsequently becoming player-coach at Wokingham Town and putting to use the coaching qualifications he had acquired while a professional player. He was later youth coach at Queens Park Rangers and coached at Farnborough Town. In August 1984 he was appointed manager of Wycombe Wanderers, and guided them to promotion to the Alliance Premier League in his first season in charge, but only because the two teams finishing above them failed the ground grading criteria. Wycombe were relegated the next season, though Bence had already left in January 1986 because of increasing work commitments.

Personal life 
Bence entered the brewing industry in 1977. As of 2011, he was national sales manager for Wadworth Brewery.

Honours 
Brentford

 Football League Fourth Division: 1971–72

Individual

 Brentford Hall of Fame

References

1948 births
Living people
People from Littlehampton
English footballers
Brighton & Hove Albion F.C. players
Reading F.C. players
Brentford F.C. players
Torquay United F.C. players
English Football League players
English football managers
Wycombe Wanderers F.C. managers
Wokingham Town F.C. players
Association football midfielders
Association football fullbacks
Isthmian League players